Sergey Grigoryev (born 24 June 1992) is a Kazakhstani athlete specialising in the pole vault. He won the silver medal at the 2017 Summer Universiade.

His personal bests in the event are 5.65 metres outdoors (Busan 2017) and 5.50 metres indoors (Kamenogorsk 2016)

International competitions

References

1992 births
Living people
Kazakhstani male pole vaulters
Athletes (track and field) at the 2014 Asian Games
Athletes (track and field) at the 2018 Asian Games
Universiade medalists in athletics (track and field)
Universiade silver medalists for Kazakhstan
Asian Games competitors for Kazakhstan
Medalists at the 2017 Summer Universiade